The 2013 Australian Carrera Cup Championship was a CAMS sanctioned Australian motor racing title open to Porsche 911 GT3 Cup cars. The title, which was the ninth Australian Carrera Cup Championship, was won by Craig Baird.

Teams and drivers

Race calendar
The championship was contested over a seven-round series.

Points system
Championship points were awarded to the first 25 finishers in each race as per the following table.

In addition to contesting the outright championship, each driver was classified as either Professional or Elite and competed for the relevant class title. Points were awarded for class places in each race on the same basis as for the outright championship.

The results for each round were determined by the number of championship points scored by each driver at that round, with both the Professional and Elite class having round winners.

The driver gaining the highest points total over all rounds was declared the winner of the championship.

Championship standings

Overall

Professional Class

Elite Class

References

External links

 

Australian Carrera Cup Championship seasons
Carrera Cup Championship